Max Purcell and Luke Saville were the defending champions but only Purcell chose to defend his title, partnering Jake Delaney. Purcell lost in the first round to Harri Heliövaara and Sem Verbeek.

Evan King and Benjamin Lock won the title after defeating Kimmer Coppejans and Sergio Martos Gornés 3–6, 6–3, [10–8] in the final.

Seeds

Draw

References

External links
 Main draw

Launceston International - Men's Doubles
2020 Men's Doubles